Bougoula  is a village and rural commune in the Cercle of Kati in the Koulikoro Region of south-western Mali. The commune contains 11 villages and at the time of the 2009 census had a population of 10,780. The village of Bougoula is 50 km south of the Malian capital, Bamako.

References

External links
.

Communes of Koulikoro Region